Stephen Paul Whitton (born 4 December 1960) is an English former footballer who played as a striker. He was born in East Ham, London.

Career
In a playing career spanning 20 years (1978–1998), Whitton made more than 450 league appearances. He played in the Football League and Premier League in England, the Swedish Allsvenskan and the Hong Kong First Division League. After being forced to retire with injury he became assistant manager at Colchester United under Steve Wignall and his successor Mick Wadsworth. He went on to manage the team after Wadsworth resigned just weeks before the start of the season. He continued as manager until he left by mutual consent in early 2003.

Managerial statistics

Honours

Club
Ipswich Town
Football League Second Division: 1991–92

Colchester United
Football League Trophy runner-up: 1996–97

Individual
Colchester United Player of the Year: 1994–95

References
General

Specific

1960 births
Living people
Footballers from East Ham
English footballers
Association football forwards
Coventry City F.C. players
Seiko SA players
West Ham United F.C. players
Birmingham City F.C. players
Sheffield Wednesday F.C. players
Halmstads BK players
Ipswich Town F.C. players
Colchester United F.C. players
English Football League players
Hong Kong First Division League players
Allsvenskan players
Premier League players
English football managers
Colchester United F.C. managers
English expatriate footballers
Expatriate footballers in Hong Kong
Expatriate footballers in Sweden
English Football League managers